Otkritie Holding, formerly Otkritie Financial Corporation (Otkritie FC) and Otkrytiye investment group, is a Russian private financial group established in 1995 as VEO-Invest company.

As of 2016 Otkritie Holding is Russia's largest private financial group, and ranks among Russia’s 35 largest corporations according to RBC 500.

Subsidiaries and shareholdings 

The group consists of Otkritie FC Bank (66.64% as of 2017), Otkritie Capital, Otkritie Broker, Otkritie Asset Management, Arkhangelskgeoldobycha (diamond miner) and it also holds minority stakes in top companies in their segments of the financial market: Baltic Leasing, Qiwi, Lukoil-Garant Non-State Pension Fund, Non-State Pension Fund of the Electric Power Industry, and RCB Bank (Cyprus). The group is acquiring Rosgosstrakh at the moment. Otkritie has sold its 19.8 per cent stake in Cypriot bank RCB.

Owners 
Otkrytiye Holding Shareholder Structure:
 Vadim Belyaev (28.61%)
 IFD Group — 19.9%
 VTB Bank (9.99%)
 ICT Holding (9.82%)
 Ruben Aganbegyan (7.96%)
 Alexander Mamut (6.67%)

History

Otkrytiye bank (1992-2014) 

Bank Otkrytiye, formerly Russian Development Bank (Russkiy Bank Razvitiya), was a Russian commercial bank in 1992-2014, a part of Otkrytiye Holding.

In 2014, Otkritie Bank and Novosibirsk Municipal Bank are merged into the Bank of Khanty-Mansiysk and the resulting bank is named Khanty-Mansiysk Otkritie Bank.

Khanty-Mansiysk Otkritie Bank (1992-2016) 
Khanty-Mansiysk Otkritie Bank, formerly Khanty-Mansiysk Bank, was a Russian commercial bank in 1992-2016, a part of Otkrytiye Holding. Otkritie Holding completed the legal takeover of Khanty-Mansiysk Otkritie Bank by Otkritie FC Bank in 2016.

References

External links 

 
 open.ru - official website before 2016 at web.archive.org

Financial services companies of Russia
Financial services companies established in 1995
Companies based in Moscow
1995 establishments in Russia